The R543 is a Regional Route in South Africa that connects Vrede with the Mahamba Border Post with Eswatini via Volksrust, Wakkerstroom and Piet Retief.

Route

Free State
Its western terminus is the R34 in Vrede, Free State. It leaves the town to the east, crossing the provincial border into Mpumalanga.

Mpumalanga
At Volksrust it meets the southern terminus of the R23 before intersecting, and being briefly co-signed with, the N11. Leaving the town to the east, it pass through Wakkerstroom running close to the border with KwaZulu-Natal. After leaving Wakkerstroom, it bends slightly to the north, taking an east-north-easterly direction to Piet Retief, where it meets the co-signed N2 and R33 at a staggered junction. Leaving the town, it heads south-east to the Eswatini border at Mahamba Border Post. After crossing into Eswatini, the road is designated MR-9.

References

Regional Routes in the Free State (province)
Regional Routes in Mpumalanga